York University is a subway station on Line 1 Yonge–University of the Toronto subway. It is located on the main Keele Campus of York University, near Ian Macdonald and York Boulevards in the former city of North York.

History

The official groundbreaking ceremony for the Toronto–York Spadina Subway Extension (TYSSE) was held on November 27, 2009; however, tunnelling operations did not commence until June 2011. The project, including York University station, was initially expected to be completed by the second quarter of 2015 but was delayed to the fourth quarter of 2016; ultimately, the station opened on December 17, 2017.

The first stage of construction for the station began in May 2011. On October 11, 2011, one of the geostructural drilling rigs on site collapsed and killed Kyle Knox, an operator working for a contractor on the project, Anchor Shoring. The incident injured five other workers.

Before the extension opened, more than 1,400 Toronto Transit Commission (TTC) buses served the campus every weekday at the York University Bus Loop, in addition to hundreds more from regional services: GO Transit, York Region Transit (YRT), Brampton Transit's Züm, and Greyhound. Züm buses are the only regional buses still serving the campus today.

This station, along with the five other TYSSE stations, were the first to be opened without collectors, although booths were installed as per original station plans. It was also among the first eight stations to discontinue sales of legacy TTC fare media (tokens and tickets). Presto vending machines were available at its opening to sell Presto cards and to load funds or monthly passes onto them. On May 3, 2019, this station became one of the first ten stations to sell Presto tickets via Presto vending machines.

Description

The station lies at the east end the Harry W. Arthurs Common on the west side of Ian MacDonald Boulevard. The university's main buildings lie to the west; Seneca College's York campus is found to the south, and the Aviva Centre to the west. The station was built underground, lying on a northwest–southeast axis. The line approaches from Finch West station along Keele Street, then bends towards the northwest to meet the station.

Engineering consultants Arup and architecture firm Foster and Partners designed the station, which has a boomerang shape with entrances at the north and south ends of the structure. The station incorporates themes first explored in underground stations for Canary Wharf in London and the Bilbao Metro in Spain, which were also designed by Foster and Partners. Its design considers the surrounding public space and uses natural light to intuitively guide passengers from the entrance down to the platforms.

The north entrance contains stairs and escalators down to the concourse level and then more stairs to the fare gates. Besides stairs, the south entrance provides a barrier-free route consisting of an elevator to the concourse level plus a ramp to the fare gates. Natural light flows through the concourse down to the platform level. The station has a metal cool roof to reflect heat from sun rays. The fare-paid area features a Gateway Newstands kiosk.

Artwork 
"Piston Effect" consists of a series of glass panels on the west walls at concourse level and above the northbound track. Behind the panels are liquid crystal displays (LCDs) that detect the passage of a train and then produce a lighting display in various tones of black and white. It was designed by British-based Jason Bruges Studio, who specialize in kinetic and light art.

Surface connections

Toronto Transit Commission
To reduce bus traffic on campus, the station has no attached bus terminal and routes still serving the campus make direct connections to the subway at Pioneer Village station on Steeles Avenue at the north end of the university grounds, after being moved from the campus TTC bus loop when the subway opened. Transfers are required to connect to surface routes on-street:

Regional transit
  
In 2018, all YRT bus services were moved to Pioneer Village station; in 2019, GO Transit relocated its services to Highway 407 station, leaving Brampton Transit's route 501 Züm Queen as the last non-TTC service serving the campus. The main branch of the route was cut back to Vaughan Metropolitan Centre station in September 2018, leaving only the express A/C branches to serve the campus. These express branches were later discontinued indefinitely in March and April 2020, coinciding with service reductions in response to the global COVID-19 pandemic, resulting in no regional buses operating to and from the campus for the next two and a half years, until the 501C branch was restored with limited weekday service on September 6, 2022.   

There is an inactive proposal to eliminate the double (YRT plus TTC) fare for passengers arriving at the York University campus from Vaughan Metropolitan Centre, Highway 407, or Pioneer Village stations in (or bordering) York Region who transferred from connecting YRT buses. A memorandum of understanding between the TTC and YRT stated: "Upon commencement of revenue services operations of the [TYSSE], York Region agrees not to operate or permit the operation of public transit services directly onto the York University campus." This assumed the elimination of the double fare for those riding a YRT bus to the stations in York Region and continuing by subway to the campus. The plan was to use a third party technology system to reimburse one of the two fares, though such a solution has not yet been implemented. Despite the continuing lack of fare integration, YRT stopped serving the campus after September 1, 2018, forcing passengers to walk from the Pioneer Village Terminal or pay a TTC fare to take the subway one stop to reach it.

On January 7, 2019, GO Transit also ended service to the campus and station, with buses connecting to the more distant Highway 407 station. Between January 2018 and March 2020, there was a $1.50 fare discount for GO Transit riders paying with Presto, transferring to or from the subway (a TTC system-wide policy with GO).

Brampton Transit (Züm)
 
It is now the sole non-TTC route to do so:

See also
York University
York University Busway

References

External links

York University station at the Toronto Transit Commission
Map indicating alignment of extension and location of stations

Line 1 Yonge–University stations
Railway stations in Canada opened in 2017
Railway stations in Canada at university and college campuses
North York
York University
2017 establishments in Ontario